Davidson is a town in south central Saskatchewan, Canada. Located approximately halfway between Saskatoon and Regina, it is a popular stopping point with many restaurants and gas stations located adjacent to the highway.

History
In 1902 Colonel Andrew Duncan Davidson, an enthusiastic entrepreneur from Glencoe, Ontario, came to Saskatchewan in hopes of creating a 'midway' settlement between the cities of Regina and Saskatoon. With agriculture as one of his driving passions, Davidson, through the Saskatchewan Valley Land Company, purchased  from the railway and the federal government in an area where the soil was particularly suitable for grain farming. Davidson organized a train route that travelled from Chicago to Saskatoon; making one stop in Davidson on the way. This train route brought American bankers, entrepreneurs and newspapermen in hopes of starting up new businesses in the area.

Within a short period of time, Davidson, which was declared the name of the community, was nicknamed the 'Midway Town' because of its central location. On 15 November 1906, Davidson was officially declared a town.

During World War II the Royal Canadian Air Force built and operated RCAF Station Davidson as a component of the British Commonwealth Air Training Plan. This site should not be confused with Davidson Municipal Airport which is adjacent to the town, on the south end.

Geography

Climate

Demographics 

Sports and recreation
Hockey, baseball, fitness, curling, figure skating, dance, gymnastics, and riding are some of the activities offered to members of the community. The Davidson Cyclones of the Long Lake Hockey League play at the Davidson AGT Centre.

Davidson is home to the 9-hole grass green, Davidson Golf and Country Club.

The swimming pool beside the local campground offers swimming lessons.

Gallery

Education
Davidson Elementary School and Davidson High School were formerly part of the Davidson School Division, which also included schools in the communities of Kenaston, Craik and Eyebrow. As of January 1, 2006, DES and DHS are part of the Sun West School Division. In a small community, the school is at its core. This allows many opportunities for the community to get actively involved in the school and vice versa. Some of the partnerships between the school and the community include working for "Communities in Bloom," contributing to the recycling program at SARCAN, and planting trees around the newly established walking trail. Davidson School's mission statement is "Developing, Encouraging, Succeeding; Creating the Future"

Media
The community newspaper is The Davidson Leader, publishing since 1904.

See also
 List of communities in Saskatchewan
 List of towns in Saskatchewan

References

External links

Towns in Saskatchewan
BCATP
Military history of Canada during World War II
Division No. 11, Saskatchewan